Tow Truck is the third album from The Perpetrators. The follow-up to the 2005's The Gas and The Clutch, it is the first Perpetrators album to feature Chris "MAMA" Bauer on drums (and guitar on his composition, "R.Cowboy," which features J Nowicki on the drumkit) alongside founding members, Nowicki and Ryan Menard.

Guest musicians featured on the disc include (original band member) Chris Saywell and Donny Zeuff of the D. Rangers; Sarah Dugas and Andrina Turenne of Madrigaia; Damon Mitchell Nathan and the New Meanies; Grant Siemens of the Corb Lund Band; Joanna Miller of the Scott Nolan Band; Andrew Neville and Rob Vaarmeyer of the Poor Choices; Alice Ramsay and Billy Merritt.

The album was recorded by Len Milne at Bedside Studios in Winnipeg, Manitoba, Canada.

Track listing
 "The Z-Rays Cured My Hangover"
 "Movin' Right Along"
 "I Can't See"
 "You're Gonna Kill Me"
 "Call Me"
 "Happy Friday"
 "Carly Song"
 "Honeypie"
 "R. Cowboy"
 "I Saw You Leaving"
 "Josco"
 "Toe Stub"
 "Baltimore"
 "Woman of My Dreams"
 "(Tow Truck)"

References

2007 albums
The Perpetrators albums